Armor and Sturtevant were an American husband and wife musical and recording artist duo that existed from 1991 to 2005. They lived and were based in Erie, Pennsylvania.

Musical genre and instrumentation
Armor & Sturtevant interpreted folk music from East Africa, Appalachia, and the British Isles, and wrote songs inspired and influenced by various folk traditions, classical music, bluegrass, rock and roll, and jazz. Their collaborative work utilized many instruments including:

Kelly Armor: voice, flute, bass flute, fife, pennywhistle, chivoti, piano, accordion, concertina, bodhrán and various East African hand percussion instruments such as the kalimba and the kayamba.

Dave Sturtevant: voice, acoustic guitar, electric guitar, resophonic guitar, banjo, mandolin, and fiddle.

History
Armor & Sturtevant toured across the United States and appeared in other countries, performing and offering workshops at opera houses, schools, churches, and multicultural events and festivals. They worked in collaboration with a ballet company, a women's chorus, a flute choir, an African drum and dance ensemble, Appalachian cloggers, a chamber orchestra and a children's choir. They were listed on the Pennsylvania Performing Arts on Tour Roster (and received two grants from them ), and the Pennsylvania Council on the Arts Roster for Arts in Education, and they have been favorably reviewed in The Plain Dealer, Erie Daily Times, Dirty Linen Magazine, the Rockville Gazette and the Washington Post.

Biographies
Kelly Armor studied composition at Yale University with David Hicks and Martin Bresnick, and flute performance with Thomas Nyfenger.  For 2 years she lived with native families in Kenya and Tanzania, became fluent in Swahili, and collected Pagan, Islamic, and Christian traditional songs, learning to play indigenous flutes and hand percussion instruments. She received a B.A. in Intercultural Studies and Ethnomusicology from the Friends World Program of Long Island University in 1988. She has given workshops and lectures on East African music and culture for the Library of Congress, the National Flute Association, and at Chautauqua Institution. In 1999, she was hired as an oral historian by the Erie Maritime Museum where she collected stories about Erie's lakefront history. She currently serves as the Director of Education and Folk Art at the Erie Art Museum, where she has taught classes as part of the Earth Force Call to Action youth workshop program  and has participated in more than 30 long-term residencies with pre-school, elementary, middle school, and adult students. She is active in the Unitarian Universalist Church, and has taught and performed there along with Tanzanian musician Fadhil Nkurlu, and appeared on their radio show Studio One with Karen Impola. Other collaborations with Nkurlu include classes at the University of Northern Iowa and Chautaugua Institute in New York State. She also has played with the Great American Gypsies.

Dave Sturtevant learned singing and fiddle from his father (born in the Appalachian foothills of north central Pennsylvania), performing traditional ballads, camp songs, and Lutheran hymns.  He studied voice and trumpet in high school and college, and is self-taught on guitar. In 1986 he received a B.S. in Sound Recording Technology from the State University of New York at Fredonia. In 1993 he was a finalist in the Kerrville New Folk Songwriting  Contest. His songs have been recorded and performed by other nationally touring folk musicians such as Joe Stead, Dan Duggan, John Kirk, Neal and Leandra, and Sue Trainor..

Recording and broadcast
Armor and Sturtevant have produced recordings of their own music and performances of musicological interest from other parts of the world. Both of their CDs on the Tatema Music label have garnered air play on folk radio programs nationwide, including National Public Radio's Car Talk, WVBR's Bound for Glory series  and internationally on the United States Information Agency's Voice of America. They have also appeared on the albums of Dan Berggren and the Great American Gypsies.

Past performances
 Blissfest, Cross Village, Michigan
 Baltimore Folk Music Society, Maryland
 Caffè Lena, Saratoga, New York
 Grand River Folk Art Society, Grand Rapids, Michigan
 Central Pennsylvania Festival of the Arts
 Fredonia Opera House, Fredonia, New York
 Whitaker Center, Harrisburg, Pennsylvania
 Bickford Theater, Morris Museum, Morristown, New Jersey
 Two Harbors Folk Festival, Minnesota
 Common Ground, Westminster, Maryland
 Shenandoah Music Festival, Orkney Springs, Virginia
 Frostburg State University, Frostburg, Maryland
 Reading Musical Foundation, Reading, Pennsylvania
 Kent State University Folk Festival, Kent, Ohio
 Starwood Festival, Sherman, New York
 The Great Blue Heron Music Festival, Sherman, New York
 Down East Folklore Society, Beaufort, North Carolina
 Tidewater Friends of Folk Music, Norfolk, Virginia
 Morgan County Arts Council, Berkeley Springs, West Virginia
 Erie Summer Festival of the Arts, Pennsylvania
 Calliope Folk Music Society, Pittsburgh, Pennsylvania
 Fredericksburg Songwriters' Showcase 1998, Fredericksburg, VA
 GottaGetGon Folk Festival, Saratoga County, New York
 Westminster College, New Wilmington, Pennsylvania 
 First Congregational Church, River Edge, New Jersey

Discography
 1993 - Spring Day (Tatema Music) - CD and cassette
 1996 - You Dance Like You Drive (Tatema Music) - CD and cassette 
 2003 - Crayola Doesn't Make a Color for Your Eyes - Erie Pennsylvania School District: Limited Edition Recording of the District Choir's Annual Concert (125 kids singing a Kristin Andreasson song and doing body percussion under Armor & Sturtevant's direction.)
 2008 - next one by - Davy Sturtevant & Brenda Jean (Butch Bunny Records)

Performed as guest artists
 1985 - Adirondack Green - Dan Berggren (remastered for CD in 2001) Sleeping Giant Records
 1997 - Cloudsplitter - Dan Berggren (Sleeping Giant Records) Folk and Acoustic Music Exchange: review by Kerry Dexter of Peterborough Folk Music Society
 2001 - Rooted in the Mountains - Dan Berggren, Dan Duggan and friends (Dave Sturtevant only) (Sleeping Giant Records) Daily Vault review by Duke Egbert
 2004 - Before I Had A Red Tomato - Great American Gypsies (Caravan Recordings) Review by John R. Lindermuth in Rambles Magazine
 2005 - Minerva - Dan Berggren (Sleeping Giant Records)

Musicological recordings
 2001 - Vavaka:  Contemporary Christian Composers of Madagascar (Erie Art Museum)
 2004 - Roho: Songs of the Spirit from East Africa (Erie Art Museum)

Film
 2002 - Safe Harbor: A Story of the Underground Railroad - A Main Street Media Inc. Production in association with the Harry Burleigh Society, the Northwest Pennsylvania Freedom Institute and WQLN Public Broadcasting of Northwestern Pennsylvania

References

  Musical Diversity Makes Its Way to Westminster College. Westminster Weekly article

External links
 Armor & Sturtevant website

Musical groups established in 1991
Musicians from Erie, Pennsylvania
1991 establishments in Pennsylvania